The following elections occurred in the year 2010.

 National electoral calendar 2010
 Local electoral calendar 2010
 2010 United Nations Security Council election

Africa
 2010 Burkinabé presidential election
 2010 Burundian Senate election
 2010 Burundian legislative election
 2010 Burundian presidential election
 2010 Comorian presidential election
 2010 Darfurian amalgamation referendum
 2010 Egyptian parliamentary election
 2010 Egyptian Shura Council election
 2010 Ethiopian general election
 2010 Guinean presidential election
 2010 Ivorian presidential election
 2010 Kenyan constitutional referendum
 2010 Malagasy constitutional referendum
 2010 Mauritian general election
 2010 Namibian local and regional elections
 2010 Nigerien constitutional referendum
 2010 Rwandan presidential election
 2010 São Tomé and Príncipe legislative election
 2010 Somaliland presidential election
 2010 Sudanese general election
 2010 Tanzanian general election
 2010 Togolese presidential election
 2010 Zanzibari government of national unity referendum

Asia
 2010 Afghan parliamentary election
 2010 Azerbaijani parliamentary election
 2010 Bahraini parliamentary election
 2010 Burmese general election
 2010 Hong Kong by-election
 2010 Iraqi parliamentary election
 2010 Japanese House of Councillors election
 2010 Kyrgyzstani constitutional referendum
 2010 Kyrgyzstani parliamentary election
 2010 Nagorno-Karabakh parliamentary election
 2010 Republic of China municipal elections
 2010 South Korean local elections
 2010 Sri Lankan parliamentary election
 2010 Sri Lankan presidential election
 2010 Tajikistani parliamentary election
 Transnational Constituent Assembly of Tamil Eelam election 2010
 2011 United Arab Emirates parliamentary election
 2009–2010 Uzbekistani parliamentary election

India
 2010 Bihar legislative assembly election
 2009–10 Tamil Nadu Legislative Assembly by-elections
 2010 Tripura Tribal Areas Autonomous District Council election

Iraq
 2010 Iraqi parliamentary election
 2010 Iraqi Status of Forces Agreement referendum

Japan
 June 2010 Democratic Party (Japan, 1998) leadership election
 September 2010 Democratic Party (Japan, 1998) leadership election
 2010 Japanese House of Councillors election
 2010 Okinawa gubernatorial election

Malaysia
 2010 Batu Sapi by-election
 2010 Galas by-election
 2010 Hulu Selangor by-election
 2010 Sibu by-election

Philippines
 2010 Batangas local elections
 2010 Bohol local elections
 2010 Bulacan local elections
 2010 Cavite City local elections
 2010 Cebu City local elections
 2010 Laguna local elections
 2010 Makati local elections
 2010 Manila local elections
 2010 Marikina local elections
 2010 Marilao local elections
 2010 Marinduque local elections
 2010 Meycauayan local elections
 2010 Navotas local elections
 2010 Philippine general election
 2010 Philippine barangay and Sangguniang Kabataan elections
 2010 Quezon City local elections
 2010 Taguig local elections
 2010 Valenzuela local elections

Philippine general
 2010 Philippine general election
 2010 Philippine House of Representatives elections in the Autonomous Region in Muslim Mindanao
 Ang Ladlad
 Death and funeral of Corazon Aquino
 2010 Philippine House of Representatives elections in the Bicol Region
 2010 Philippine House of Representatives elections in Calabarzon
 2010 Philippine House of Representatives elections in the Cordillera Administrative Region
 2010 Philippine House of Representatives elections in Cagayan Valley
 2010 Philippine House of Representatives elections in Caraga
 2010 Philippine House of Representatives elections in Central Visayas
 Controversies in the 2010 Philippine general election
 2010 Philippine House of Representatives elections in the Davao Region
 2010 Philippine House of Representatives elections in Eastern Visayas
 2010 Philippine gubernatorial elections
 2010 Philippine House of Representatives elections
 2010 Philippine House of Representatives elections in the Ilocos Region
 List of representatives elected in the 2010 Philippine House of Representatives election
 List of senators elected in the 2010 Philippine Senate election
 2010 Philippine House of Representatives elections in Mimaropa
 Maguindanao massacre
 2010 Philippine House of Representatives elections in Metro Manila
 2010 Philippine House of Representatives elections in Northern Mindanao
 Opinion polling for the 2010 Philippine Senate election
 Opinion polling for the 2010 Philippine presidential election
 2010 Philippine House of Representatives party-list election
 2010 Philippine House of Representatives elections in Central Luzon
 2010 Philippine presidential election
 Retiring and term-limited incumbents in the 2010 Philippine House of Representatives election
 2010 Philippine House of Representatives elections in Soccsksargen
 2010 Philippine Senate election
 2010 Philippine House of Representatives elections in Western Visayas
 2010 Philippine House of Representatives elections in the Zamboanga Peninsula

Philippine presidential
 2010 Aquino–Binay Campaign
 2010 Benigno Aquino III presidential campaign
 Presidential transition of Benigno Aquino III
 2010 Philippine presidential election

Taiwan (Republic of China)
 2010 Republic of China municipal elections

Europe
 2010 Azerbaijani parliamentary election
 2010 Belarusian presidential election
 2010 Belgian general election
 2010 Bosnia and Herzegovina general election
 2010 Civic Platform presidential primary
 2006 Crimean parliamentary election
 2010 Crimean parliamentary election
 2009–2010 Croatian presidential election
 2010 Croatian labour law referendum
 2010 Czech legislative election
 2010 Czech Senate election
 Faroese constitutional referendum
 2010 Greek local elections
 2010 Greek presidential election
 2010 Hungarian parliamentary election
 2010 Hungarian presidential election
 2010 Icelandic Constitutional Assembly election
 2010 Icelandic debt repayment referendum
 2010 Icelandic municipal elections
 2010 Ivano-Frankivsk Oblast local election
 2010 Kosovan parliamentary election
 2010 Latvian parliamentary election
 2010 Montenegrin municipal election
 2010 Nagorno-Karabakh parliamentary election
 2010 Northern Cyprus presidential election
 2010 Polish Senate by-elections
 2010 Polish presidential election
 2010 Reykjavik City Council election
 2010 Slovak political reform referendum
 2010 Slovak parliamentary election
 2010 Swedish general election
 2010 Turkish constitutional referendum
 2010 Ukrainian local elections
 2010 Ukrainian presidential election
 2010 Zakarpattia Oblast local election

Austria
 2010 Austrian presidential election
 2010 Burgenland state election
 2010 Viennese state election

France
 2010 Franche-Comté regional election
 2010 French regional elections
 2010 Île-de-France regional election

Germany
 2010 North Rhine-Westphalia state election
 2010 German presidential election

Italy
 2010 Apulian regional election
 2010 Basilicata regional election
 2010 Calabrian regional election
 2010 Campania regional election
 2010 Emilia-Romagna regional election
 2010 Italian regional elections
 2010 Lazio regional election
 2010 Ligurian regional election
 2010 Lombard regional election
 2010 Marche regional election
 2010 Piedmontese regional election
 2010 Tuscan regional election
 2010 Umbrian regional election
 2010 Venetian regional election

Moldova
 2010 Moldovan parliamentary election
 2010 Moldovan constitutional referendum
 2010 Transnistrian legislative election

Netherlands
 2010 Dutch general election

Spain
 2010 Catalonian parliamentary election

Switzerland
 2010 Swiss Federal Council election
 March 2010 Swiss referendum
 November 2010 Swiss referendums
 September 2010 Swiss referendum

United Kingdom
 2010 Labour Party (UK) leadership election
 2010 Liberal Democrats deputy leadership election
 2010 Referendum (Scotland) Bill
 2010 Ulster Unionist Party leadership election
 2010 United Kingdom general election
 2010 United Kingdom Independence Party leadership election

United Kingdom local
 2010 United Kingdom local elections

English local
 2010 Adur Council election
 2010 Barking and Dagenham Council election
 2010 Barnet Council election
 2010 Barnsley Council election
 2010 Bassetlaw Council election
 2010 Bexley Council election
 2010 Birmingham City Council election
 2010 Bolton Council election
 2010 Brent Council election
 2010 Brentwood Council election
 2010 Bristol City Council elections
 2010 Bromley Council election
 2010 Broxbourne Council election
 2010 Burnley Council election
 2010 Camden Council election
 2010 Cheltenham Council election
 2010 Chorley Council election
 2010 Craven Council election
 2010 Croydon Council election
 2010 Ealing Council election
 2010 Enfield Council election
 2010 Fareham Council election
 2010 Great Yarmouth Council election
 2010 Greenwich Council election
 2010 Hackney Council election
 2010 Hammersmith and Fulham Council election
 2010 Haringey Council election
 2010 Harrow Council election
 2010 Havering Council election
 2010 Hillingdon Council election
 2010 Hounslow Council election
 2010 Huntingdonshire Council election
 2010 Islington Council election
 2010 Kensington and Chelsea Council election
 2010 Kingston upon Thames Council election
 2010 Lambeth Council election
 2010 Lewisham Council election
 2010 Liverpool Council election
 2010 London local elections
 2010 Manchester Council election
 2010 Merton Council election
 2010 Newham Council election
 2010 North Tyneside Council election
 2010 Oxford City Council election
 2010 Plymouth City Council election
 2010 Preston Council election
 2010 Purbeck Council election
 2010 Redbridge Council election
 2010 Redditch Council election
 2010 Richmond upon Thames Council election
 2010 Rossendale Council election
 2010 Rushmoor Council election
 2010 Sheffield Council election
 2010 Slough Council election
 2010 Southwark Council election
 2010 St Albans Council election
 2010 Stevenage Council election
 2010 Stockport Council election
 2010 Sutton Council election
 2010 Swindon Council election
 2010 Thurrock Council election
 2010 Tower Hamlets Council election
 2010 Trafford Council election
 2010 Tunbridge Wells Council election
 2010 Walsall Council election
 2010 Waltham Forest Council election
 2010 Wandsworth Council election
 2010 West Lancashire Council election
 2010 Westminster Council election
 2010 Weymouth and Portland Council election
 2010 Winchester Council election
 2010 Wirral Council election
 2010 Wolverhampton Council election

United Kingdom general
 2010 United Kingdom general election
 Results breakdown of the 2010 United Kingdom general election
 2010 United Kingdom general election result in Cornwall
 2010 United Kingdom general election results in Wales
 2010 United Kingdom general election result in Glasgow
 2010 United Kingdom general election result in Surrey
 2010 United Kingdom general election result in Lancashire
 2010 United Kingdom general election results in England
 2010 United Kingdom general election results in Scotland
 Boundary changes for the 2010 United Kingdom general election
 English Democrats Party election results
 List of MPs standing down at the 2010 United Kingdom general election
 List of United Kingdom Parliament constituencies
 List of parties contesting the 2010 United Kingdom general election
 List of MPs elected in the 2010 United Kingdom general election
 Newspaper endorsements in the 2010 United Kingdom general election
 Opinion polling for the 2010 United Kingdom general election
 Parliamentary candidates in Hertfordshire
 Power 2010
 2010 United Kingdom general election debates

North America
 Costa Rican general election, 2010

Canada
 2010 Canadian electoral calendar
 2010 Canadian federal by-elections
 2010 Manitoba municipal elections
 2010 New Brunswick general election
 2010 Nova Scotia provincial by-elections
 2010 Progressive Conservative Party of Prince Edward Island leadership election
 2010 Quebec provincial by-elections

Alberta municipal
 2010 Alberta municipal elections
 2010 Calgary municipal election
 2010 Edmonton municipal election
 2010 Lethbridge municipal election
 2010 Red Deer municipal election
 2010 Strathcona County municipal election
 2010 Wood Buffalo municipal election

Ontario municipal
 2010 Ontario municipal elections
 2010 Algoma District municipal elections
 2010 Brantford municipal election
 2010 Bruce County municipal elections
 2010 Cochrane District municipal elections
 2010 Dufferin County municipal elections
 2010 Durham Region municipal elections
 2010 Elgin County municipal elections
 2010 Essex County municipal elections
 2010 Frontenac County municipal elections
 2010 Greater Sudbury municipal election
 2010 Grey County municipal elections
 2010 Guelph municipal election
 2010 Haliburton County municipal elections
 2010 Halton Region municipal elections
 2010 Hamilton, Ontario municipal election
 2010 Hastings County municipal elections
 2010 Huron County municipal elections
 2010 Kenora District municipal elections
 2010 Lambton County municipal elections
 2010 Lanark County municipal elections
 2010 Leeds and Grenville United Counties municipal elections
 2010 Lennox and Addington County municipal elections
 2010 Manitoulin District municipal elections
 2010 Middlesex County municipal elections
 2010 Muskoka District municipal elections
 2010 Niagara Region municipal elections
 2010 Nipissing District municipal elections
 2010 Norfolk County municipal election
 2010 Northumberland County municipal elections
 2010 Ottawa municipal election
 2010 Oxford County municipal elections
 2010 Parry Sound District municipal elections
 2010 Peel Region municipal elections
 2010 Perth County municipal elections
 2010 Peterborough County municipal elections
 2010 Peterborough municipal election
 2010 Prescott and Russell United Counties municipal elections
 2010 Rainy River District municipal elections
 2010 Renfrew County municipal elections
 2010 Simcoe County municipal elections
 2010 Stormont, Dundas and Glengarry United Counties municipal elections
 2010 Sudbury District municipal elections
 2010 Thunder Bay District municipal elections
 2010 Timiskaming District municipal elections
 2010 Toronto mayoral election
 2010 Toronto municipal election
 2010 Waterloo Region municipal elections
 2010 Wellington County municipal elections
 2010 York Region municipal elections

Caribbean
 2010 Anguillan general election
 2010 Costa Rican general election
 2010 Curaçao general election
 2010 Dominican Republic parliamentary election
 2010 Dominican by-election
 2010–2011 Haitian general election
 2010 Martinique status referendum
 2010 Netherlands Antilles general election
 2010 Saint Kitts and Nevis general election
 2010 Saint Vincent and the Grenadines general election
 2010 Sint Maarten general election
 2010 Trinidad and Tobago general election
 2010 Trinidad and Tobago local election
 2010 United States Virgin Islands gubernatorial election

United States Virgin Islands
 2010 United States House of Representatives election in the United States Virgin Islands
 2010 United States Virgin Islands gubernatorial election
 2010 United States Virgin Islands general election

Mexico
 Mexican gubernatorial elections, 2010

United States
 2010 United States elections
 2010 United States state legislative elections
 The Daily Show: Indecision 2010
 2010 Navajo Nation presidential election

United States Senate
 2010 United States Senate elections
 2010 United States Senate election in Alabama
 2010 United States Senate election in Alaska
 2010 United States Senate election in Arizona
 2010 United States Senate election in Arkansas
 2010 United States Senate election in California
 2010 United States Senate election in Colorado
 2010 United States Senate election in Connecticut
 2010 United States Senate special election in Delaware
 2010 United States Senate election in Florida
 2010 United States Senate election in Georgia
 2010 United States Senate election in Hawaii
 2010 United States Senate election in Idaho
 2010 United States Senate election in Illinois
 2010 United States Senate election in Indiana
 2010 United States Senate election in Iowa
 2010 United States Senate election in Kansas
 2010 United States Senate election in Kentucky
 2010 Linda McMahon U.S. Senate campaign
 2010 United States Senate election in Louisiana
 2012 United States Senate election in Maine
 2010 United States Senate election in Maryland
 2010 United States Senate special election in Massachusetts
 2012 United States Senate election in Michigan
 2012 United States Senate election in Minnesota
 2010 United States Senate election in Missouri
 2012 United States Senate election in Montana
 2010 United States Senate election in Nevada
 2010 United States Senate election in New Hampshire
 2010 United States Senate election in New York
 2010 United States Senate special election in New York
 2010 United States Senate election in North Carolina
 2010 United States Senate election in North Dakota
 2010 United States Senate election in Ohio
 2010 United States Senate election in Oklahoma
 Opinion polling for the 2010 United States Senate elections
 2010 United States Senate election in Oregon
 2010 United States Senate election in Pennsylvania
 2010 United States Senate Democratic primary election in Pennsylvania
 2010 United States Senate election in South Carolina
 2010 United States Senate election in South Dakota
 2010 United States Senate election in Utah
 2010 United States Senate election in Vermont
 2012 United States Senate election in Virginia
 2010 United States Senate election in Washington
 2010 United States Senate special election in West Virginia
 2010 United States Senate election in Wisconsin

United States House of Representatives
 2010 United States House of Representatives elections
 2010 United States House of Representatives elections in Alabama
 2010 United States House of Representatives election in Alaska
 2010 United States House of Representatives election in American Samoa
 2010 United States House of Representatives elections in Arizona
 2010 United States House of Representatives elections in Arkansas
 2010 United States House of Representatives elections in California
 2010 United States House of Representatives elections in Colorado
 2010 United States House of Representatives elections in Connecticut
 2010 United States House of Representatives election in Delaware
 2010 United States House of Representatives election in the District of Columbia
 2010 United States House of Representatives elections in Florida
 2010 Florida's 19th congressional district special election
 2010 United States House of Representatives elections in Georgia
 2010 Georgia's 9th congressional district special election
 2010 United States House of Representatives election in Guam
 2010 United States House of Representatives elections in Hawaii
 2010 Hawaii's 1st congressional district special election
 2010 United States House of Representatives elections in Idaho
 2010 United States House of Representatives elections in Illinois
 2010 United States House of Representatives elections in Indiana
 2010 United States House of Representatives elections in Iowa
 2010 United States House of Representatives elections in Kansas
 2010 United States House of Representatives elections in Kentucky
 2010 United States House of Representatives elections in Louisiana
 2010 United States House of Representatives elections in Maryland
 2010 United States House of Representatives elections in Massachusetts
 2010 United States House of Representatives elections in Michigan
 2010 United States House of Representatives elections in Minnesota
 2010 United States House of Representatives elections in Mississippi
 2010 United States House of Representatives elections in Missouri
 2010 United States House of Representatives election in Montana
 2010 United States House of Representatives elections in Nevada
 2010 United States House of Representatives elections in New Hampshire
 2010 United States House of Representatives elections in New Jersey
 2010 United States House of Representatives elections in New Mexico
 2010 United States House of Representatives elections in New York
 2010 New York's 29th congressional district elections
 2010 United States House of Representatives elections in North Carolina
 2010 United States House of Representatives election in the Northern Mariana Islands
 2010 United States House of Representatives elections in Ohio
 2010 United States House of Representatives elections in Oklahoma
 Opinion polling for the 2010 United States House of Representatives elections
 2010 United States House of Representatives elections in Oregon
 2010 United States House of Representatives elections in Pennsylvania
 2010 Pennsylvania's 12th congressional district special election
 Pledge to America
 2010 United States House of Representatives elections in Rhode Island
 2010 United States House of Representatives elections in South Carolina
 2010 United States House of Representatives election in South Dakota
 2010 United States House of Representatives elections in Tennessee
 2010 United States House of Representatives elections in Utah
 2010 United States House of Representatives election in the United States Virgin Islands
 2010 United States House of Representatives elections in Virginia
 2010 United States House of Representatives elections in Washington
 2010 United States House of Representatives elections in West Virginia
 2010 United States House of Representatives elections in Wisconsin
 2010 United States House of Representatives election in Wyoming

United States gubernatorial
 2010 United States gubernatorial elections
 2010 Alabama gubernatorial election
 2010 Alaska gubernatorial election
 2010 Arizona gubernatorial election
 2010 Arkansas gubernatorial election
 2010 California gubernatorial election
 2010 Colorado gubernatorial election
 2010 Connecticut gubernatorial election
 2010 Florida gubernatorial election
 2010 Georgia gubernatorial election
 2010 Guam gubernatorial election
 2010 Hawaii gubernatorial election
 2010 Idaho gubernatorial election
 2010 Illinois gubernatorial election
 2010 Iowa gubernatorial election
 2010 Kansas gubernatorial election
 2010 Maine gubernatorial election
 2010 Maryland gubernatorial election
 2010 Massachusetts gubernatorial election
 2010 Michigan gubernatorial election
 2010 Minnesota gubernatorial election
 2010 Nebraska gubernatorial election
 2010 Nevada gubernatorial election
 2010 New Hampshire gubernatorial election
 2010 New Mexico gubernatorial election
 2010 New York gubernatorial election
 2010 Ohio gubernatorial election
 2010 Oklahoma gubernatorial election
 Opinion polling for the 2010 United States gubernatorial elections
 2010 Oregon gubernatorial election
 2010 Pennsylvania gubernatorial election
 2010 Rhode Island gubernatorial election
 2010 South Carolina gubernatorial election
 2010 South Dakota gubernatorial election
 2010 Tennessee gubernatorial election
 2010 Texas gubernatorial election
 2010 United States Virgin Islands gubernatorial election
 2010 Utah gubernatorial special election
 2010 Vermont gubernatorial election
 2010 Wisconsin gubernatorial election
 2010 Wyoming gubernatorial election

United States mayoral
 2010 Honolulu mayoral election
 2010 Louisville mayoral election
 2010 New Orleans mayoral election
 2010 Washington, D.C. mayoral election

Alabama
 2010 Alabama elections
 2010 Alabama gubernatorial election
 2010 United States House of Representatives elections in Alabama
 2010 United States Senate election in Alabama

Alaska
 2010 Alaska elections
 2010 Alaska gubernatorial election
 2010 United States House of Representatives election in Alaska
 2010 United States Senate election in Alaska

American Samoa
 2010 American Samoan constitutional referendum
 2010 American Samoan general election
 2010 United States House of Representatives election in American Samoa

Arizona
 2010 Arizona elections
 2010 Arizona gubernatorial election
 2010 Arizona Proposition 203
 2010 United States House of Representatives elections in Arizona
 2010 Arizona Proposition 100
 2010 United States Senate election in Arizona

Arkansas
 2010 Arkansas elections
 2010 Arkansas gubernatorial election
 2010 United States House of Representatives elections in Arkansas
 2010 United States Senate election in Arkansas

California
 June 2010 California state elections
 November 2010 California state elections
 2010 California Attorney General election
 2010 California gubernatorial election
 2010 California Insurance Commissioner election
 2010 California lieutenant gubernatorial election
 2010 San Francisco Board of Supervisors election
 June 2010 San Francisco general election
 November 2010 San Francisco general election
 2010 California Secretary of State election
 2010 California State Assembly election
 2010 California State Controller election
 2010 California State Senate election
 2010 California State Treasurer election
 2010 United States House of Representatives elections in California
 2010 United States Senate election in California

Colorado
 2010 Colorado elections
 2010 Colorado gubernatorial election
 2010 United States House of Representatives elections in Colorado
 2010 United States Senate election in Colorado

Connecticut
 2010 Connecticut attorney general election
 2010 Connecticut House of Representatives election
 2010 Connecticut Senate election
 2010 Connecticut elections
 2010 Connecticut gubernatorial election
 2010 United States House of Representatives elections in Connecticut
 2010 United States Senate election in Connecticut

Delaware
 2010 Delaware elections
 2010 United States House of Representatives election in Delaware
 2010 United States Senate special election in Delaware

Florida
 2010 Florida's 19th congressional district special election
 2010 Florida elections
 2010 Florida gubernatorial election
 2010 United States House of Representatives elections in Florida
 2010 United States Senate election in Florida

Georgia (U.S. state)
 2010 Georgia's 9th congressional district special election
 2010 Georgia statewide elections
 2010 Georgia gubernatorial election
 2010 Georgia state elections
 2010 United States House of Representatives elections in Georgia
 2010 United States Senate election in Georgia
 2010 Georgia General Assembly election

Guam
 2010 Guam gubernatorial election
 2010 Guamanian general election
 2010 Guamanian legislative election

Hawaii
 2010 Hawaii gubernatorial election
 2010 Hawaii's 1st congressional district special election
 2010 Honolulu mayoral election
 2010 United States House of Representatives elections in Hawaii
 2010 United States Senate election in Hawaii

Idaho
 2010 Idaho gubernatorial election
 2010 United States House of Representatives elections in Idaho
 2010 United States Senate election in Idaho

Illinois
 2010 Illinois gubernatorial election
 2010 Illinois House of Representatives election
 2010 Illinois Senate election
 2010 Illinois elections
 2010 United States House of Representatives elections in Illinois
 2010 United States Senate election in Illinois

Indiana
 2010 Indiana elections
 2010 United States Senate election in Indiana
 2010 United States House of Representatives elections in Indiana

Iowa
 2010 United States House of Representatives elections in Iowa
 2010 United States Senate election in Iowa
 2010 Iowa gubernatorial election

Kansas
 2010 Kansas gubernatorial election
 2010 United States House of Representatives elections in Kansas
 2010 United States Senate election in Kansas

Kentucky
 2010 Kentucky elections
 2010 Louisville mayoral election
 2010 United States House of Representatives elections in Kentucky
 2010 United States Senate election in Kentucky

Louisiana
 2010 Louisiana state elections
 2010 New Orleans mayoral election
 2010 New Orleans city council election
 2010 United States House of Representatives elections in Louisiana
 2010 United States Senate election in Louisiana

Maine
 2010 Maine elections
 2010 Maine gubernatorial election
 2010 United States House of Representatives elections in Maine

Maryland
 2010 Maryland Attorney General election
 2010 Maryland Comptroller election
 2010 Maryland county executive elections
 2010 Maryland county offices elections
 2010 Maryland elections
 2010 Maryland gubernatorial election
 2010 United States House of Representatives elections in Maryland
 2010 United States Senate election in Maryland

Massachusetts
 2010 Massachusetts gubernatorial election
 2010 United States House of Representatives elections in Massachusetts
 2010 Massachusetts general election
 2010 United States Senate special election in Massachusetts

Michigan
 2010 Michigan gubernatorial election
 2010 Michigan elections
 2010 United States House of Representatives elections in Michigan

Minnesota
 2010 Minnesota House of Representatives election
 2010 Minnesota Senate election
 2010 Minnesota State Auditor election
 2010 Minnesota Attorney General election
 2010 Minnesota elections
 2010 Minnesota gubernatorial election
 2010 Minnesota Secretary of State election
 2010 United States House of Representatives elections in Minnesota

Mississippi
 2010 United States House of Representatives elections in Mississippi

Missouri
 2010 Missouri elections
 2010 United States House of Representatives elections in Missouri
 2010 United States Senate election in Missouri

Montana
 2010 United States House of Representatives election in Montana
 2010 Montana elections

Nebraska
 2010 Nebraska elections
 2010 Nebraska gubernatorial election
 2010 United States House of Representatives elections in Nebraska

Nevada
 Scott Ashjian
 2010 Nevada Attorney General election
 2010 Nevada elections
 2010 Nevada gubernatorial election
 Tea Party of Nevada
 2010 United States House of Representatives elections in Nevada
 2010 United States Senate election in Nevada

New Hampshire
 2010 New Hampshire gubernatorial election
 2010 United States Senate election in New Hampshire
 2010 United States House of Representatives elections in New Hampshire

New Mexico
 2010 New Mexico gubernatorial election
 2010 United States House of Representatives elections in New Mexico

New York
 2010 New York Comptroller election
 2010 New York state elections
 2010 New York Attorney General election
 2010 New York gubernatorial election
 2010 New York's 29th congressional district elections
 2010 United States House of Representatives elections in New York
 2010 United States Senate election in New York
 2010 United States Senate special election in New York

North Carolina
 2010 North Carolina elections
 2010 North Carolina judicial election
 2010 United States House of Representatives elections in North Carolina
 2010 United States Senate election in North Carolina

North Dakota
 2010 North Dakota elections
 2010 United States House of Representatives election in North Dakota
 2010 United States Senate election in North Dakota

Northern Mariana Islands
 2010 United States House of Representatives election in the Northern Mariana Islands

Ohio
 2010 Ohio elections
 2010 Ohio gubernatorial election
 2010 United States Senate election in Ohio
 2010 United States House of Representatives elections in Ohio

Oklahoma
 2010 Oklahoma gubernatorial election
 2010 Oklahoma state elections
 2010 United States House of Representatives elections in Oklahoma
 2010 United States Senate election in Oklahoma

Oregon
 2010 Oregon state elections
 2010 Oregon legislative election
 2010 Oregon gubernatorial election
 2010 United States House of Representatives elections in Oregon
 2010 United States Senate election in Oregon

Pennsylvania
 2010 Pennsylvania gubernatorial election
 2010 Pennsylvania lieutenant gubernatorial election
 2010 Pennsylvania House of Representatives election
 2010 Pennsylvania Senate elections
 2010 Pennsylvania elections
 2010 Pennsylvania's 12th congressional district special election
 2010 United States Senate election in Pennsylvania
 2010 United States Senate Democratic primary election in Pennsylvania
 2010 United States House of Representatives elections in Pennsylvania

Rhode Island
 2010 Rhode Island gubernatorial election

South Carolina
 2010 South Carolina gubernatorial election
 2010 South Carolina elections
 2010 United States House of Representatives elections in South Carolina
 2010 United States Senate election in South Carolina

South Dakota
 2010 South Dakota gubernatorial election
 2010 United States House of Representatives election in South Dakota
 2010 South Dakota elections
 2010 United States Senate election in South Dakota

Tennessee
 2010 Tennessee gubernatorial election
 2010 United States House of Representatives elections in Tennessee

Texas
 2010 Texas gubernatorial election
 2010 Texas elections
 2010 United States House of Representatives elections in Texas

United States Virgin Islands
 2010 United States House of Representatives election in the United States Virgin Islands
 2010 United States Virgin Islands gubernatorial election
 2010 United States Virgin Islands general election

Utah
 2010 Utah gubernatorial election
 2010 United States House of Representatives elections in Utah
 2010 United States Senate election in Utah

Vermont
 2010 Vermont gubernatorial election
 2010 United States House of Representatives election in Vermont
 2010 United States Senate election in Vermont

Virginia
 2010 United States House of Representatives elections in Virginia
 2010 Virginia elections
 2010 Virginia's 11th congressional district election
 2010 Virginia's 5th congressional district election
 2010 Virginia's 8th congressional district election

Washington (U.S. state)
 2010 Washington elections
 2010 United States House of Representatives elections in Washington
 2010 United States Senate election in Washington
 2010 Washington House of Representatives election
 2010 Washington's 21st Legislative District, House 2 election

Washington, D.C.
 2010 United States House of Representatives election in the District of Columbia
 2010 Washington, D.C. mayoral election

West Virginia
 2010 United States Senate special election in West Virginia
 2010 United States House of Representatives elections in West Virginia
 2010 West Virginia elections

Wisconsin
 2010 United States House of Representatives elections in Wisconsin
 2010 United States Senate election in Wisconsin
 2010 Wisconsin state elections
 2010 Wisconsin elections
 2010 Wisconsin gubernatorial election

Wyoming
 2010 Wyoming gubernatorial election
 2010 United States House of Representatives election in Wyoming

Oceania
 2010 Bougainvillean general election
 2010 Bougainvillean presidential election
 2010 Cook Islands general election
 2010 Cook Islands Member of Parliament reduction referendum
 2010 Faleata West by-election
 2010 Nauruan constitutional referendum
 April 2010 Nauruan parliamentary election
 June 2010 Nauruan parliamentary election
 2010 Nauruan presidential election
 2010 Safata by-election
 2010 Solomon Islands general election
 2010 Tongan general election
 2010 Tuvaluan general election
 2010 Vaisigano by-election

American Samoa
 2010 American Samoan constitutional referendum
 2010 American Samoan general election
 2010 United States House of Representatives election in American Samoa

Australia
 2010 Altona state by-election
 2010 Araluen by-election
 2010 Armadale state by-election
 Australian 2010 election upper house results
 2010 Australian federal election
 2010 Australian Labor Party leadership election
 Full national and state-by-state lower house results and maps for the 2010 Australian federal election
 Opinion polling for the 2010 Australian federal election
 2010 Penrith state by-election
 2010 South Australian state election
 2010 Tasmanian state election
 2010 Victorian state election

Guam
 2010 Guam gubernatorial election
 2010 Guamanian general election
 2010 Guamanian legislative election

Hawaii
 2010 Hawaii gubernatorial election
 2010 Hawaii's 1st congressional district special election
 2010 Honolulu mayoral election
 2010 United States House of Representatives elections in Hawaii
 2010 United States Senate election in Hawaii

New Zealand
 2010 New Zealand local elections
 2010 Auckland local elections
 2010 Auckland mayoral election
 2010 Christchurch mayoral election
 2010 Dunedin mayoral election
 2010 Dunedin local elections
 2010 Invercargill mayoral election
 2010 Mana by-election
 2010 Wellington City mayoral election
 2010 Wellington local elections

Northern Mariana Islands
 2010 United States House of Representatives election in the Northern Mariana Islands

South America
 2011 Bolivian judicial election
 2010 Bolivian regional election
 2010 Colombian legislative election
 2010 Colombian presidential election
 2010 French Guiana status referendum
 2010 Surinamese legislative election
 2010 Surinamese presidential election
 2010 Venezuelan parliamentary election

Brazil
 2010 Brazilian general election
 2010 Bahia gubernatorial election
 Brazil can do more
 2010 Brazilian presidential election
 2010 Brazilian gubernatorial elections
 2010 Brazilian parliamentary election
 2010 Brazilian presidential election debates
 For Brazil to keep on changing
 2010 Goiás gubernatorial election
 Opinion polling for the 2010 Brazilian presidential election

See also
 :Category:2010 elections

2010